Neleucania praegracilis is a species of cutworm or dart moth in the family Noctuidae first described by Augustus Radcliffe Grote in 1877. It is found in North America.

The MONA or Hodges number for Neleucania praegracilis is 10613.

References

Further reading

 
 
 

Eriopygini
Articles created by Qbugbot
Moths described in 1877